Jean-Cluade Ntenda (born 3 September 2002) is a French professional footballer who plays as a defender for  club Juventus Next Gen.

Career 
Jean-Claude Ntenda started to play football at age of 10 at Taverny as a forward. In 2017, Ntenda moved to Nantes becoming a defender. On 8 January 2020, Ntenda moved to Juventus. He made his debut for Juventus U23 on 22 August 2021 in a 3–2 Coppa Italia Serie C win against Pro Sesto. On 15 September, after a Coppa Italia Serie C match against Feralpisalò won 3–2, Ntenda had an anterior cruciate ligament injury. On 18 June 2022, Ntenda renewed his Juventus contract until 2024.

International career 
Born in France, Ntenda is of Congolese descent. He is a youth international for France.

Career statistics

Club

References

Notelist

External links 

FFF Profile

2002 births
Living people
People from Champigny-sur-Marne
French footballers
France youth international footballers
French sportspeople of Democratic Republic of the Congo descent
Association football central defenders
FC Nantes players
Juventus F.C. players
Juventus Next Gen players
Serie C players
French expatriate footballers
French expatriate sportspeople in Italy
Expatriate footballers in Italy
Black French sportspeople